Halina Barbara Jaruzelska (née Ryfa; 23 January 1931 – 29 May 2017) was a Polish academic, philologist, and professor of German studies and language. Jaruzelska was the First Lady of Poland from 1985 to 1990 during the government of her husband, General Wojciech Jaruzelski, the President of the Polish People's Republic (1985–1989) and the President of the Republic of Poland (1989–1990). Professionally, Jaruzelska worked as a lecturer and German philology professor at the Institute of Applied Linguistics at the University of Warsaw.

Jaruzelska died in on 29 May 2017, at the age of 86. She was survived by her daughter, journalist and designer Monika Jaruzelska. Her funeral was held at Saint Charles Borromeo Church in Warsaw on 6 June 2017. She was interred in Powązki Cemetery, while her husband, who died in 2014, was buried in a different cemetery, Powązki Military Cemetery.

References

1931 births
2017 deaths
First Ladies of Poland
Germanists
Academic staff of the University of Warsaw
Writers from Lublin
Burials at Powązki Cemetery